Microcolona spaniospila is a moth in the family Elachistidae. It was described by Turner in 1923. It is found in Australia, where it has been recorded from Queensland.

References

Moths described in 1923
Microcolona
Moths of Australia